The 1996 Northern Colorado Bears football team was an American football team that won the 1996 NCAA Division II national championship.

The team represented the University of Northern Colorado in the North Central Conference (NCC) during the 1996 NCAA Division II football season. In their eighth season under head coach Joe Glenn, the Bears compiled a 12–3 record (6–3 against conference opponents), outscored opponents by a total of 435 to 254, and tied for second place in the NCC. The team advanced to the playoffs and won the national championship by defeating  in the championship game.

The team played its home games at Nottingham Field in Greeley, Colorado.

Schedule

References

Northern Colorado
Northern Colorado Bears football seasons
1996 Northern Colorado
Northern Colorado Bears football